The 1953–54  Kansas Jayhawks men's basketball team represented the University of Kansas during the 1953–54 college men's basketball season.

Roster
B. H. Born
Dallas Dobbs
Allen Kelley
Hal Patterson
Larry Davenport
Bill Brainard
Bill Heitholt
Harold McElroy
Gary Padgett
John Anderson
Jerry Alberts
Jack Wolfe
Chris Divich
LaVannes Squires
Jim Toft
Len Martin
Bob Crisler

Schedule

Rankings

References

Kansas Jayhawks men's basketball seasons
Kansas
Kansas
Kansas